Persatuan Sepak Bola Blitar Kota, commonly known as PSBK Blitar, is an  Indonesian football club based in Blitar, East Java. They play in Liga 3. Their nicknames are Laskar PETA and Macan Lodro. They play their home match in Gelora Supriyadi Stadium., which is located in downtown Blitar.

References

External links
Liga-Indonesia.co.id

Football clubs in Indonesia
Association football clubs established in 2006
Football clubs in East Java
2006 establishments in Indonesia